Cenodocus granulosus is a species of beetle in the family Cerambycidae. It was described by Francis Polkinghorne Pascoe in 1866. It is known from Malaysia and Borneo.

References

Pteropliini
Beetles described in 1866